Man Between Vice and Virtue is an 1892 symbolist painting by Henri Martin. The painting is currently housed in le Musée des Augustins, in Toulouse, France.

Description
Against the backdrop of a desert landscape, a naked man appears to advance towards a floating female figure clothed in a virginal white dress that emanates in the right portion of the painting.

The man in the painting is followed by a group of women clothed in transparent flowery attire. The group seems to dance and sing in order to attract his attention. In the center of the group is a woman in black dress with peacock feathers and butterfly wings, which symbolize vice in its many forms.

The work is signed "Henri Martin 92" in the lower right corner.

History
Martin adopted a divisionist (pointillist) technique upon returning to Paris from Italy in the 1880s His style was slowly transitioning from realism. This work in particular is unusual because of the realist portrayal of the man's body.

References

1892 paintings
Symbolist paintings
Collections of the Musée des Augustins
Dance in art
Fairies in art
Sun in art